Everybody Wants to Be on TV is the second studio album by the English band Scouting for Girls. It was released on 12 April 2010 through Epic. The first single on the album debuted on the Scott Mills BBC Radio 1 show on 15 January 2010. The album artwork was released on 19 January 2010. It is the second time that producer Andy Green has collaborated with Scouting for Girls to produce an album.

The album was to be re-released and include the single "Love How It Hurts", which was released on 10 July 2011, but the re-release was cancelled due to the band working on their third studio album The Light Between Us and the single was instead featured on that album.

Recording 
The album took over a year to initially write and prepare but, in summer 2009, Scouting for Girls began recording the final album and had completed it by autumn. Otis Spooge was dropped from the line up on account of his poor whistling on the previous album, although both parties have since said this was an amicable decision. They had the initial album written but scrapped it after the 2008 BRIT Awards when they decided it needed rewriting. On their official website, Roy Stride said:
We had the album written, but decided it just wasn't good enough so we trashed it and started over again. I just wanted to write the perfect pop song. We are perfectionists!

Singles 
 "This Ain't a Love Song" is the first single from the album Everybody Wants to Be on TV. It was described by Amazon as "a powerful, soaring song". It was released on 28 March 2010 as a digital download, with the physical release the following day and debuted at number 1 on the UK Singles Chart on 4 April 2010, marking the band's most successful single to date.
 "Famous" is the second single from the album and was released as a digital download on 11 July 2010, with the physical release the following day. On 4 July 2010, it debuted on the UK Singles Chart at number 97.
 "Don't Want to Leave You", is the third single from the album and is the new name for "Silly Song". It was released digitally on 10 October and physical release on the following day. It reached number 69 on the UK Singles Chart.
 "Take a Chance", is the fourth single from the album and is the official soundtrack of the Dutch movie Loft. It was released on 10 December, the music video was also released on that same day.
"Love How It Hurts" was to be the fifth single from the album and was to feature on the re-release of the album, however, the re-release was cancelled and Love How It Hurts ended up serving as the lead single from Scouting For Girl's following album, The Light Between Us.

Reception 

Everybody Wants to Be on TV received mixed reviews garnering a score of 47/100 at aggregator website Metacritic.

Track listing

Charts and certifications

Weekly charts

Year-end charts

Certifications

Personnel

Personnel 
Band
 Roy Stride – guitar, piano, lead vocals
 Greg Churchouse – bass, backing vocals
 Pete Ellard – drums, percussion

Technical credits 
Production
 Andy Green – producer, mixing engineer
 Julian Willmott – audio engineer
 Ted Jenson – mastering

Artwork
 Lisa Peardon; Dean Chalky; Ellis Parrinder; Lisa Gold – photography
 Fern's Dad – Artwork

Notes 

Scouting for Girls albums
2010 albums